Chiu Yuh-chuan (born 21 August 1960) is a Taiwanese weightlifter. He competed in the men's bantamweight event at the 1984 Summer Olympics.

References

1960 births
Living people
Taiwanese male weightlifters
Olympic weightlifters of Taiwan
Weightlifters at the 1984 Summer Olympics
Place of birth missing (living people)